Manel Royo Castell (born 28 February 1994) is a Spanish professional footballer who plays as a left-back for Eerste Divisie club Almere City.

Career

In 2017, Royo signed for the reserves of Spanish La Liga side Espanyol.

In 2018, he signed for Barakaldo in the Spanish third division.

In 2019, Royo signed for Czech club Teplice, where he made 5 appearances and scored 0 goals.

Royo joined Dutch Eerste Divisie club Almere City on 19 July 2022, signing a two-year contract. He made his competitive debut on the opening day of the 2022–23 season, coming off the bench in the 76th minute for Thomas Poll in a 3–0 loss to VVV-Venlo.

References

External links
 
 

1994 births
Living people
Spanish footballers
Spanish expatriate footballers
Association football defenders
Tercera División players
Czech First League players
Segunda División B players
Nike Academy players
Villarreal CF players
Real Valladolid Promesas players
FK Teplice players
CD Ebro players
UE Costa Brava players
Almere City FC players
Spanish expatriate sportspeople in the Czech Republic
Spanish expatriate sportspeople in the Netherlands
Expatriate footballers in the Czech Republic
Expatriate footballers in the Netherlands